"Hymn for the Weekend" is a single by the British rock band Coldplay from their seventh studio album A Head Full of Dreams (2015), featuring uncredited vocals from American singer Beyoncé. It was written by the band's members (Guy Berryman, Jonny Buckland, Will Champion, and Chris Martin), while the production was handled by Rik Simpson, Avicii, Digital Divide, and Stargate. An indie R&B track, "Hymn for the Weekend" showcases the culture of India.

"Hymn for the Weekend" has reached number six on the UK Singles Chart and also reached the top twenty in countries such as Switzerland, Ireland, France, Sweden, Austria, Belgium, Italy and Spain. In the US, with the Seeb remix, the song reached number 25 on the US Billboard Hot 100. A music video for the song was released on 29 January 2016 and features Coldplay in various cities in India, with Beyoncé performing in some scenes. It also featured Indian Bollywood actress Sonam Kapoor in a brief role.

Background
The song was debuted on Annie Mac's BBC radio show on 30 November 2015. According to Berryman, lead singer Chris Martin originally wanted the song to be a party song with the lyrics "drinks on me, drinks on me", but his bandmates didn't think that would go well with their fans. Martin's longtime friend Beyoncé was asked to sing on the song, and she accepted the request.

Martin corroborated Berryman's story about the band protesting him singing, "Drinks on me, drinks on me" in an interview with The Wall Street Journal. According to Martin, the original kernel was that he "was listening to Flo Rida or something", and he thought, "it's such a shame that Coldplay could never have one of those late-night club songs, like "Turn Down for What". I thought I'd like to have a song called 'Drinks on Me' where you sit on the side of a club and buy everyone drinks because you're so fucking cool," Martin recalled. "I was chuckling about that, when this melody came, 'drinks on me, drinks on me', then the rest of the song came out. I presented it to the rest of the band and they said, 'We love this song, but there's no way you can sing "drinks on me."' So that changed into 'drink from me' and the idea of having an angelic person in your life. Then that turned into asking Beyoncé to sing on it."

Composition
"Hymn for the Weekend" is written in the key of C minor set in a  time signature at a moderate tempo of 90 beats per minute.

Critical reception
"Hymn For The Weekend" received generally positive reviews from critics. Jody Rosen of Billboard called it "the album's grooviest". Helen Brown of The Daily Telegraph wrote: "Beyoncé makes more of her appearance on 'Hymn for the Weekend', bringing her chunky harmonies and no-nonsense brass section to a peppy little excursion into indie R&B which opens with a paradisiacal fanfare and finds Martin dropping out of his falsetto autopilot into a more raw voice." Sarah Rodman of The Boston Globe wrote "... it's with the third track, 'Hymn for the Weekend', that the album truly lifts off on the wings of an angelic choir (including Beyoncé), a swaggering piano, and a euphoric, lightly funky track bolstering Martin's exclamations of feeling high."

In a mixed review, Carl Williot of Idolator wrote, "The Beyoncé-assisted 'Hymn for the Weekend' almost equals (the album's) energy, but it lacks the drama of 'Princess of China'", adding, that as a track featuring Beyoncé "you'd expect a show-stopping moment." He concluded "the guys sound like total goobers trying to do the club swagger thing, like a drunk dad doing the rap dance du jour at a wedding."

Music video
According to The Times of India, the music video was shot in October 2015 at various Indian cities including Worli Village, Mumbai, and Kolkata. The fort showcased at the start and in between is Fort Vasai in Vasai, Mumbai. Scenes were also shot at the Maratha Mandir theatre, which is known for showcasing a single film, Dilwale Dulhania Le Jayenge, for over 22 consecutive years. The video is themed on the Indian festival of Holi and was filmed by Ben Mor, being released on 29 January 2016. It features Beyoncé and Indian actress Sonam Kapoor. With 1.8 billion views on YouTube , "Hymn for the Weekend" is Coldplay's most-viewed video and the second-most featuring the band, behind the Chainsmokers' lyric video for "Something Just Like This". Luminate Data reported the song "had the most total combined audio and video streams globally in 2022", with 35.9 million views coming from Canada, and 434.5 million from the United States.

In other media
On 22 November 2016, the song was made available as downloadable content for the music video game Rock Band 4.

Live performance
The song was performed for the first time during the 2016 Brit Awards on 24 February 2016.

Track listing

Credits and personnel
Credits are adapted from A Head Full of Dreams liner notes.

Coldplay
Guy Berryman – bass guitar
Jonny Buckland – electric guitar, backing vocals
Will Champion – drums, drum pad, percussion, backing vocals
Chris Martin – lead vocals, piano

Additional musicians
Avicii – additional programming
Regiment Horns – brass
Beyoncé – guest vocals

Charts

Weekly charts

Year-end charts

All-time charts

Certifications

Release history

References

External links
 

2016 singles
2015 songs
Coldplay songs
Beyoncé songs
Song recordings produced by Rik Simpson
Song recordings produced by Stargate (record producers)
Songs written by Chris Martin
Songs written by Guy Berryman
Songs written by Jonny Buckland
Songs written by Will Champion
Number-one singles in Iceland
Number-one singles in Israel
Number-one singles in Poland
Songs about alcohol
Songs about drugs
Song recordings produced by Avicii
Parlophone singles
Atlantic Records singles